The Drake–Northern Iowa rivalry is the American collegiate athletics rivalry between the Drake Bulldogs sports teams of Drake University and Northern Iowa Panthers sports teams of the University of Northern Iowa.

Both universities are located in the State of Iowa and are members of the Missouri Valley Conference. Drake’s campus located in Des Moines and Northern Iowa’s campus located Cedar Falls are only 123 miles apart.  The universities are two of the Big Four schools (four NCAA Division I institutions in Iowa).

Background

Drake University is a private institution founded in 1881. They Bulldogs were one of the charter members of the Missouri Valley Conference. The University of Northern Iowa is a public institution founded in 1876. The Panthers joined the Missouri Valley Conference in 1991. 
The schools have been in-state rivals since their founding; however, the rivalry intensified when the Panthers joined the Missouri Valley Conference.

Football rivalry

The Missouri Valley Conference has not officially sanctioned football since 1985. Football was discontinued by the conference due to the attendance and financial requirements to maintain their “major” or “FBS” conference status. As a result, Drake joined to Pioneer Football League and Northern Iowa joined the Gateway Football Conference (now known as the Missouri Valley Football Conference). The league offices are still connected to the Missouri Valley Conference office in Saint Louis, Missouri. 
Drake (13) and Northern Iowa (33) have combined for 46 football conference championships. The Bulldogs were undefeated in major college football in 1922. The Panthers played in the 2005 FCS National Championship. Drake and Northern Iowa first met on the gridiron in 1900.

Men's basketball rivalry
The Bulldogs and Panthers first played in men’s basketball in 1908; however, they only played six games prior to the 1980’s. Drake appeared in the 1969 NCAA Division I Final Four narrowly falling to UCLA and has appeared in three NCAA Division I Elite Eights. Northern Iowa upset top seed Kansas advancing to the NCAA Division I Sweet Sixteen in 2010. They have combine for twelve Missouri Valley Conference regular season championships (Drake 9, Northern Iowa 3) and six Missouri Valley Conference tournament championships (Drake 1, Northern Iowa 5). The Panthers also won the 1990 Mid-Continent Conference tournament.

In 2019 Northern Iowa upset two seed co-regular season champion Drake in the Missouri Valley Conference tournament semifinals. The Bulldogs returned the favor in 2020 upsetting the one seed Panthers in the Missouri Valley Conference tournament quarterfinals becoming the first eight or lower seed to defeat a one seed. The teams would have played again in the 2021 Missouri Valley Conference quarterfinal; however, the game was canceled due to Covid-19 issues within the Northern Iowa program causing Drake to advance in a walkover. They also met in the earlier rounds of the Missouri Valley Conference tournament on four occasions splitting those games.

°The 2021 Missouri Valley Conference Tournament game scheduled for March 5 in Saint Louis was canceled due to a Covid-19 issue within the Northern Iowa program. Drake advanced to the semifinals in a walkover.

Women's basketball rivalry
Drake and Northern Iowa’s first official basketball game was in 1975. They had met informally prior to 1975 and the formation of their intercollegiate women’s basketball teams. Drake advanced to the 1982 NCAA Division I Elite Eight and the NCAA Division I Sweet Sixteen twice. Northern Iowa has not advanced past the NCAA Division I first round. The Bulldogs and Panthers combine for ten Missouri Valley Conference regular season championships (Drake 7, Northern Iowa 3) and ten Missouri Valley Conference tournament championships (Drake 8, Northern Iowa 2). The Bulldogs also won the 1984 Gateway Division.

The teams met in the 2017 and 2018 Missouri Valley Tournament championship with Drake prevailing on both occasions; however, Northern Iowa defeated Drake in the 2016 Women’s National Invitational Tournament. They also met three times in the earlier rounds of the Missouri Valley Conference tournament with the Bulldogs winning all three of the games.

Baseball rivalry
Drake and Northern Iowa have played forty-eight official NCAA baseball games. Their first official intercollegiate meeting occurred in 1907; however, the teams played unofficial games dating back to 1885. Both Drake (1975) and Northern Iowa (2010) have since been re-classified from NCAA Division I to college club status.

The Panthers won the 2001 Missouri Valley Conference tournament advancing the NCAA Division I tournament regional round. The Bulldogs have not advance to the NCAA Division I tournament in the College World Series era (1947 to present).

Cross country rivalry
Drake and Northern Iowa compete at the NCAA Division I level in men's and women's cross country. Drake won the 1944, 1945, and 1946 NCAA Division I national cross country team championships. The Bulldog and Panther men's and women's teams have traditionally competed in NCAA Division I regionals and at the NCAA Division I championships. The men have won sixteen Missouri Valley Conference team championships (Drake 12, Northern Iowa 4) and women have won four Missouri Valley Conference team championships (Drake 2, Northern Iowa 2).

Each school normally attends the other institutions home meet when held. The Drake Classic is hosted at Ewing Park in Des Moines, Iowa and Panther Invitationals are hosted at Pheasant Ridge Golf Course in Cedar Falls, Iowa. They also compete against each other in Big Four Duels and other meets throughout the season.

Golf rivalry
Drake and Northern Iowa compete at the NCAA Division I level in men's and women's golf. The Bulldog and Panther men's and women's teams have traditionally competed in NCAA Division I regionals and at the NCAA Division I championship. The Drake men have won five Missouri Valley Conference team championships. The Northern Iowa men, Bulldog women, and Panther women have not yet won a Missouri Valley Conference team championship.

The Bulldogs normally attend the UNI Invitational held at Pheasant Ridge Golf Course while the Panthers usually attend the Zach Johnson Invitational held at Glen Oaks Country Club. They also compete against each other in Big Four Duels and other meets throughout the season.

Rowing rivalry
The Drake women are currently the only team classified as a NCAA Division I rowing program. The Drake men along with Northern Iowa men and women are currently classified as college club status.

Rowing is the oldest intercollegiate sport in the United States dating back to 1852 (prior to each institutions founding). The Bulldog and Panther men and women teams have transitioned in-between classification dating back to 1881 (Drake) and 1876 (Northern Iowa). The teams have competed against each other when in a similar classification.

Men's soccer rivalry
Drake has fielded an NCAA Division I men's soccer team since 1986. The Bulldogs advanced to the 2009 NCAA Division I Elite Eight and have won two Missouri Valley Conference tournament championships. Northern Iowa has not competed at the NCAA Division I level in men's soccer. Prior to 1986 the two teams competed against each other under the college club status.

Women's soccer rivalry
Drake and Northern Iowa’s first official NCAA Division I women’s soccer game was in 2002. Northern Iowa sanctioned women’s soccer in 2000 and Drake sanction women’s soccer in 2002. Prior to 2000 they competed against each other under the college club status. The Bulldogs have not advanced past the NCAA Division I tournament first round, while the Panthers have never advanced to the NCAA Division I tournament. Drake has won six Missouri Valley Conference regular season championships and one Missouri Valley Conference tournament championship. Northern Iowa has not won a Missouri Valley Conference title. The 2020 match was postponed to April 7, 2021 due to the Covid-19 pandemic.

The teams have split the two Missouri Valley Conference tournament matches played. Northern Iowa won in 2017 and Drake won in 2021.

Softball rivalry
Drake and Northern Iowa’s first official softball game was in 1976. They had met informally prior to the formation of their intercollegiate softball teams. Northern Iowa won the 1977 and 1982 AIAW College World Series (pre-NCAA Division I era). Both Drake and Northern Iowa have advanced in the NCAA Division I regional rounds. The Bulldogs and Panthers combine for six Missouri Valley Conference regular season championships (Drake 3, Northern Iowa 3) and six Missouri Valley Conference tournament championships (Drake 4, Northern Iowa 2).

The teams have split their four meetings in the Missouri Valley Conference tournament. The Bulldogs and Panthers met on six occasions in the AIAW regional rounds (pre-NCAA Division I) with Drake holding a 4 win to 2 win advantage.

°2020 games were canceled due to Covid-19 pandemic

Swimming and diving rivalry
The Northern Iowa women are currently the only team classified as a NCAA Division I swimming & diving program. The Northern Iowa men along with Drake men and women are currently classified as college club status.

The Bulldog and Panther men and women teams have transitioned in-between classification for swimming & diving. The Drake men’s swimming team won the 1929 Missouri Valley Conference team championship. The Bulldog women along with the Northern Iowa men and women have never won the Missouri Valley Conference team championship.

Men's tennis rivalry
The Missouri Valley Conference first held a regular season team round robin format along with an end of the season conference team tournament during the 1996-97 season. From 1911-12 season to the 1996-97 season the conference had only held a year end tournament to determine their team champion. Drake and Northern Iowa competed on six occasions in the team format prior to the Panthers re-classification as college club status in 2003. The Bulldogs and Panthers also competed in individual competitions at the NCAA Division I level each season.

Drake has won nine Missouri Valley Conference regular season championships and ten Missouri Valley Conference tournament championships. The Bulldogs also won two Summit League championships. Drake advanced to the second round of the NCAA Division I team championships in 2013 and 2015. The Panthers have not won a Missouri Valley Conference team championship or advanced to the NCAA Division I team tournament.

Women's tennis rivalry
A regular season team round robin format along with an end of the season conference team tournament was first held by the Missouri Valley Conference during the 1996-97 season. The conference had previously only held a year end tournament to determine their team champion. The Bulldogs and Panthers have competed against each other every year in a team format since that season. Drake has won two regular season team Missouri Valley Conference championships and nine Missouri Valley Conference team tournament championships. The Bulldogs have yet to advance past the first round of the NCAA Division I team championships. Northern Iowa has not won a Missouri Valley Conference team championship or advanced to the NCAA Division I team tournament.

In addition, the Bulldogs and Panthers have competed in individual competitions at the NCAA Division I level each season since the founding of their programs.

°The 2020 match in Des Moines was canceled due to the Covid-19 pandemic.

Track and field rivalry
Drake and Northern Iowa compete at the NCAA Division I level in men's and women's indoor and outdoor track & field. The Bulldog and Panther men's and women's teams have traditionally competed in NCAA Division I regionals and at the NCAA Division I championships in both indoor and outdoor competitions. The men have won twenty-two Missouri Valley Conference indoor team championships (Drake 8, Northern Iowa 14) and twenty Missouri Valley Conference outdoor team championships (Drake 10, Northern Iowa 10). The Northern Iowa women have won two Missouri Valley Conference indoor team championships and one Missouri Valley Conference outdoor team championship; while the Drake women have not yet won a team championship in Missouri Valley Conference indoor or outdoor competition.

The Bulldogs normally attend the Jack Jennett Open at the UNI Dome. The Panthers usually attend the Jim Duncan Invitational and the Drake Relays held at Drake Stadium. They also compete against each other in Big Four Duels and other meets throughout the season.

Women's volleyball
Drake and Northern Iowa first met in women’s volleyball in 1975. The Panthers have appeared in twenty-three NCAA Division I tournaments, advancing the NCAA Division I Sweet Sixteen three times (1999, 2001, and 2002). Northern Iowa has won seventeen Missouri Valley Conference regular season championships and seventeen Missouri Valley Conference tournament championships. The Bulldogs have yet to win a Missouri Valley Conference title or advance to a NCAA Division I tournament. The Bulldogs and Panthers both appears in the AIWA Tournament regional rounds from 1975 to 1980 (the predecessor to the NCAA Division I tournament).

The teams have played five times in the Missouri Valley Conference tournament with Northern Iowa winning four of the meetings. The 2020 match-ups were postponed to January 2021 due to the Covid-19 Pandemic.

Wrestling rivalry
Northern Iowa is a traditional contender in college wrestling winning the 1950 NCAA Division I national title. The Panthers also finished as runners-up in the 1946, 1947, 1949 and 1952 NCAA Division I tournaments. Drake competed in NCAA Division I wrestling until 1994 when their team was re-classified as college club status. The schools have competed in twelve varsity duels on the wrestling mat with the Panthers claiming all twelve team victories.

Club sport rivalries
Drake and Northern Iowa have competed in multiple other men's and women's sports classified as college club status since their founding including archery, badminton, beach volleyball, bowling, climbing, cricket, croquet, curling, cycling, disc golf, dodgeball, fencing, field hockey, gymnastics, handball, ice hockey, lacrosse, martial arts, rugby, racquetball, sailing, shooting/pistol, spikeball, table tennis, ultimate frisbee, volleyball (men only), water polo, weightlifting.

See also
 Big Four Classic

References

College basketball rivalries in the United States
College football rivalries in the United States
Drake Bulldogs football
Northern Iowa Panthers football
Drake Bulldogs men's basketball
Northern Iowa Panthers men's basketball
College sports rivalries in the United States
Drake Bulldogs
Northern Iowa Panthers